Chateauguay Valley Regional is an English/Bilingual high school in Ormstown, Quebec, Canada serving the Chateauguay Valley and Valleyfield area. It is administered by the New Frontiers School Board. Enrolment is currently approximately 550 (est. 2019), but has ranged from 550 to 1500 during the school's history, in accordance with demographic trends.

CVR (as it is often referred) was opened in 1967. It was the first regional school in Quebec, built to consolidate the smaller high schools in the area into one central school, teaching grades 7 through 11. The school has a strong name in athletics, and their sports team logo is the Spartan.

Former students often affectionately refer to CVR as Chicken Valley Ranch.

Athletics 

Athletics have always been a special aspect of CVR student life since the schools opening in 1967. CVR has fielded many competitive and championship teams, including several provincial champions. (Women's Basketball (5), Women's Hockey (5), Track & Field (1), Cross Country (1) & Football (1))

CVR currently fields 46 athletic teams (24 Female & 22 Male) that compete in various disciplines in the RESQ Montérégie region, the SSIAA (South Shore Interscholastic Athletic Association) as well as the GMAA (Greater Montreal Athletic Association). CVR has also been a member of, and competed in the ETIAC (Eastern Townships Interscholastic Athletic Association) School wide house and intramural sports programs have a strong tradition at CVR.

Many former CVR students have gone on to participate in post secondary athletics in Canadian and American Colleges and Universities, Professional sport clubs, Canadian National Teams, and Olympic games (Doug Vandor 2008 & 2012 Summer Olympian, Matt Heaton 2017 & 2019 Rugby Canada Men's 15's Player of the Year)

Performing Arts 

The CVR Performing Arts department was started in 2005 and is headed by music teacher Lynn Harper, drama teacher Dawna Babin and dance teacher Cindel Chartrand. Starting with the 2005 production of the musical FAME, the department has gone on to produce subsequent shows including: Grease, Footloose, OZ, Guys and Dolls, Annie, Anything Goes, Joseph and the Amazing Technicolor Dreamcoat, Dirty Dancing, Beauty and The Beast, Charlie and The Chocolate Factory, Alice in Wonderland, Neverland, and The Lion King. Some of the students in these productions later went on to pursue higher education in the performing arts and are now graduates of or enrolled in theatre programs at Dawson College, John Abbott College and Vanier College as well as the National Theatre School of Canada.

See also 
New Frontiers School Board
Wikimapia entry for CVR
Pictures around the school
Picture of the front of the school

English-language schools in Quebec
Educational institutions established in 1967
High schools in Montérégie
1967 establishments in Quebec
Le Haut-Saint-Laurent Regional County Municipality